Choi Woo-hyuk is a Korean name consisting of the family name Choi and the given name Woo-hyuk, and may also refer to:

 Choi Woo-hyuk (actor, born 1985), South Korean actor
 Choi Woo-hyuk (actor, born 1997), South Korean actor